Willard L. Miranker (March 8, 1932 – April 28, 2011) was an American mathematician and computer scientist, known for his contributions to applied mathematics and numerical mathematics.

Raised in Brooklyn, New York, he earned B.A. (1952), M.S. (1953) and Ph.D. (1956) from the Courant Institute at New York University, the latter on the thesis The Asymptotic Theory of Solutions of U + (K2)U = 0 advised by Joseph Keller.
He then worked for the mathematics department at Bell Labs (1956–1958) before joining IBM Research (1961). After retirement from IBM, he joined the computer science faculty at Yale University (1989) as research faculty.

He also held professor affiliations at California Institute of Technology (1963), Hebrew University of Jerusalem (1968), Yale University (1973), University of Paris-Sud (1974), City University of New York (1966–) and New York University (1970–1973).

Miranker's work includes articles and books on stiff differential equations, interval arithmetic, analog computing, and neural networks and the modeling of consciousness.

Miranker was also an accomplished and prolific painter.  Over the course of his life, Willard Miranker painted ~4000 watercolors/aquarelles and ~200 oil paintings, many of which are displayed online. He exhibited  internationally in New York City, Paris and Bonn.

Awards
Fellow of the American Association for the Advancement of Science

References

External links

Paintings by Will Miranker

short page at Yale University
FindaGrave entry 

20th-century American mathematicians
21st-century American mathematicians
American computer scientists
1932 births
Courant Institute of Mathematical Sciences alumni
Scientists at Bell Labs
People from Brooklyn
IBM employees
Yale University faculty
California Institute of Technology faculty
Academic staff of the Hebrew University of Jerusalem
Academic staff of Paris-Sud University
City University of New York faculty
2011 deaths
Mathematicians from New York (state)